Tom Howe is a retired American soccer midfielder who played professionally in the North American Soccer League.

Howe attended Southern Illinois University Edwardsville, playing on the men's soccer team from 1968 to 1971.  In 2007, he was inducted into the Cougars Hall of Fame.  In 1973, Howe joined the St. Louis Stars of the North American Soccer League.  He went on to play for the Denver Dynamos and the Minnesota Kicks.

In 2004, Howe was inducted into the St. Louis Soccer Hall of Fame.
Howe helped found and coached at the Scott Gallagher Soccer Club.
He currently is the Executive Director of Coaching and Player Development at Sporting St. Louis.

References

External links
 NASL stats

1949 births
Living people
American soccer players
Denver Dynamos players
Minnesota Kicks players
North American Soccer League (1968–1984) players
St. Louis Stars (soccer) players
SIU Edwardsville Cougars men's soccer players
Association football midfielders
Soccer players from St. Louis